Ash-Shams ('The Sun') was an Arabic-language Jewish weekly newspaper in Egypt. The paper was established in 1934. The editor of ash-Shams was Saad Malki whose political outlook combined Egyptian nationalism with moderate Zionism. The weekly was closed down by the Egyptian government in May 1948.

References

1934 establishments in Egypt
1948 disestablishments in Egypt
Arabic-language newspapers
Censorship in Egypt
Defunct newspapers published in Egypt
Defunct weekly newspapers
Egyptian nationalism
Jewish Egyptian history
Jewish newspapers
Publications established in 1934
Publications disestablished in 1948
Zionism in Egypt
Weekly newspapers published in Egypt